The most important of the 29 buddhist temples of Phuket is Wat Chalong or formally Wat Chaiyathararam, located in the Chalong Subdistrict, Mueang Phuket District. It is dedicated to two highly venerable monks, Luang Pho Chaem (หลวงพ่อแช่ม) and Luang Pho Chuang (หลวงพ่อช่วง), who led the citizens of Chalong Subdistrict fighting against the Chinese rebellion in 1876 and with their knowledge of herbal medicine helped the injured.

The large market at Wat Chalong extends into the grounds of the temple and features amplified pop music and Thai-fighting advertisements.

The temple sells trinkets to visitors and the monks assist by storing boxes of items in their main prayer hall.

References

https://www.wat-chalong-phuket.com/
https://www.facebook.com/ChaithararamTempleWatChalongPhuket/

External links

Chalong